David Macpherson may refer to:

David Macpherson (engineer) (1854–1927), Canadian-born American railroad engineer
David Macpherson (historian) (1746–1816), Scottish antiquarian
David Macpherson (tennis) (born 1967), Australian former professional tennis player
David Lewis Macpherson (1818–1896), Canadian businessman and political figure
David Macpherson, 2nd Baron Strathcarron (1924–2006), British peer and motorcyclist
David Murdoch MacPherson (1847–1915), Canadian dairyman, inventor, manufacturer and political figure

See also 
David McPherson (disambiguation)